Ogaden Anbassa is an Ethiopian football club based in Harar.  They are a member of the Ethiopian Football Federation national league.

In 1978 the team has won the Ethiopian Premier League.

Stadium
Their home stadium is Harrar Bira Stadium.

Achievements
:Ethiopian Premier League
 1978

Performance in CAF competitions
CAF Confederation Cup: 1 appearance
1979 African Cup of Champions Clubs – first Round

References

External links

Football clubs in Ethiopia